Robert Gavron, Baron Gavron  (13 September 1930 – 7 February 2015) was a British printing millionaire, philanthropist and a Labour life peer.

Early life and education

Gavron was the eldest son of Nathan Gavron, a patent lawyer, and Leah Gavron. He was brought up in Hampstead Garden Suburb, north London, and studied at Leighton Park School in Reading and then at St Peter's College, Oxford. Gavron became a barrister and was called to the bar by Middle Temple in 1955.

Career
Gavron borrowed £5,000 to purchase a failing publishing house in 1964. He renamed it the St Ives Group and served as chairman from 1964 to 1993. He was the director of Octopus Publishing between 1975 and 1987 and Electra Management from 1981 to 1992. He was also the proprietor of the Carcanet Press from 1983 to 2015 and served as the chairman of the Folio Society, (1982–2015) and the National Gallery Co Ltd (1996–1998). He was both chairman of the Guardian Media Group and a trustee of the Scott Trust between 1997 and 2000.

Gavron was chairman of the Open College of the Arts (1991–1996), a director of the Royal Opera House (1992–1998), a trustee of the National Gallery (1994–2001), and of the Paul Hamlyn Foundation (1987–2005). He was a governor of the London School of Economics (1997–2002) and chaired his own charitable trust, the Robert Gavron Charitable Trust (1974–2015). He was in 1996 elected an Honorary Fellow of the Royal Society of Literature.

Politics
Gavron was active in the Labour Party and a financial contributor to the Labour Leader's Office Fund, run by Lord Levy, which financed Tony Blair's private office before the 1997 General Election. He was appointed a Commander of the Order of the British Empire (CBE) in the 1990 Birthday Honours, and received a life peerage as Baron Gavron, of Highgate in the London Borough of Camden, on 6 August 1999.
Gavron served on House of Lords, UK Parliament, Works of Art Committee from 1999 to 2003 and 2005 – 2009. Gavron was a member of the Groucho and the MCC.

Personal life
Gavron was married three times. In 1955, he married Hannah Fyvel, the daughter of T. R. Fyvel who was literary editor of Tribune and The Jewish Chronicle. They had two sons before she took her own life in 1965. One son, Jeremy Gavron, a novelist, has written a book about the tragedy.

In 1967, Gavron married Felicia Nicolette Coates, who later became a Labour member of the London Assembly, and is now known as Nicky Gavron. Before they divorced in 1987, the couple had two daughters including the film director Sarah Gavron. In 1989, Gavron married Katherine Gardiner (née Macnair).

An MCC member, Gavron was a great supporter of cricket, especially in Barbados where he was an honorary life member of the Barbados Cricket Association. He established the Lord Gavron Scholarship for promising young cricketers in 2001. Recipients are presented with a trophy, a computer, cricket equipment and an attachment to a cricket club overseas or the opportunity to study at a local institution. Since 2010 two players, usually winners of the award, have spent a season with Sefton Park and Wavertree cricket clubs in England.  Winners of the award who have gone on to play Test cricket for the West Indies include Kemar Roach, Kraigg Brathwaite, Jason Holder, Jomel Warrican, Shane Dowrich and Shai Hope.

Having survived cancer and heart surgery, Gavron died of a heart attack on 7 February 2015 after playing tennis.

See also
Companies' Remuneration Reports Bill

References

External links

Biography
Labour Party PLC: New Labour as a Party of Business – lengthy extract from David Osler's book about Labour fundraising and the Labour Leader's Office Fund
Announcement of his introduction at the House of Lords, minutes of proceedings, 9 November 1999

1930 births
2015 deaths
Burials at Highgate Cemetery
Cricketers from Greater London
Businesspeople from London
British Ashkenazi Jews
English Jews
English people of Russian-Jewish descent
English people of Lithuanian-Jewish descent
People educated at Leighton Park School
Alumni of St Peter's College, Oxford
Honorary Fellows of St Peter's College, Oxford
Fellows of the Royal Society of Literature
Commanders of the Order of the British Empire
Members of the Middle Temple
British publishers (people)
Labour Party (UK) life peers
Robert Gavron
Jewish British politicians
20th-century British philanthropists
20th-century English businesspeople
Life peers created by Elizabeth II